The Sky High Stakes is an Australian Turf Club Group 3 Thoroughbred horse race, for three year olds and older, over a distance of 2000 metres, under set weights with penalties conditions at Rosehill Gardens Racecourse in Sydney, Australia in March.  Total prize money for the race is A$350,000.

History
The race is named in honour of the Australian Thoroughbred racehorse and sire, Sky High, who won the 1960 Golden Slipper Stakes and 1961 Epsom Handicap.

Name
 1992–2005 - Sky High Quality Stakes
 2006  - The Roxy Hotel Parramatta Stakes
 2007 onwards - Sky High Stakes

Grade
Prior 1991 - Handicap (Unlisted race)
1992–2013 - Listed race
2014 onwards - Group 3

Distance
Prior 2014 - 1900 metres
 2015 - 2000 metres

Venue
In 2008 the race was held at Canterbury Park Racecourse.

Conditions
In 2016 the race was changed from a Quality handicap to Set Weights plus Penalties conditions.

Winners

 2023 - Protagonist 
 2022 - Stockman 
 2021 - Toffee Tongue 
 2020 - Master Of Wine 
 2019 - Red Cardinal 
 2018 - Auvray 
 2017 - Tavago 
 2016 - Sir John Hawkwood
 2015 - Hartnell 
 2014 - Entirely Platinum   
 2013 - Julienas
 2012 - Single 
 2011 - Older Than Time 
 2010 - Bellagio Wynn
 2009 - Kettledrum   
 2008 - Nuclear Sky 
 2007 - Coalesce
 2006 - County Tyrone
 2005 - Seul Amour
 2004 - Daniel's The Man
 2003 - National Treasure
 2002 - Restless
 2001 - Bello Signor
 2000 - Spysept  
 1999 - For The Moment 
 1998 - Joss Sticks 
 1997 - Buzzoff 
 1996 - Darbaas 
 1995 - Balmeressa
 1994 - Cross Swords
 1993 - Upwards  
 1992 - Native Neptune  
 1991 - String Quartet
 1990 - Galligaskins 
 1989 - Eye Of The Sky

See also
 List of Australian Group races
 Group races

External links 
First three place getters Sky High Stakes (ATC)

References

Horse races in Australia